The Williston Public School District #1 was a school district serving Williston, North Dakota.

While most of the district was in Williams County, where it served almost all of Williston, a section was in McKenzie County.

History
In 2020 a vote was held on whether it was to merge with the Williams County Public School District 8 (formerly New Public School District 8) to form a new district. 86.6% of the District 1 voters approved, as did 59.6% of the District 8 voters. The no percentages were 13.4% for District 1 and 40.4% for District 8.

In 2021 it merged with the Williams County Public School District 8 to form the Williston Basin School District 7.

Schools
Elementary schools
Bakken Elementary School
Hagan Elementary School
Lewis & Clark Elementary School
Rickard Elementary School
Wilkinson Elementary School

Secondary schools
Williston Middle School
Williston High School

References

External links
 (Archive until 2021)

Former school districts in North Dakota
Education in Williams County, North Dakota
Education in McKenzie County, North Dakota
Williston, North Dakota
2021 disestablishments in North Dakota
School districts disestablished in 2021